Paéz is a municipality in the Cauca Department, Colombia. The town of Belalcazar, is the main urban center of the Municipality. It was founded in 1905 by Valencia, Mosquera and Lemus.

References

External links

Municipalities of Cauca Department